Hoàng Thi Thơ (Triệu Phong, Vietnam, 1 July 1929 - Glendale, California, United States, 23 September 2001) was a Vietnamese songwriter popular in the 1950s and '60s. He was part of the musical diaspora which emigrated to Orange County, California.

References

Vietnamese songwriters
1929 births
2001 deaths
Vietnamese emigrants to the United States
People from Quảng Trị province